Adel El Maamour (born 11 November 1955) is an Egyptian football goalkeeper who played for Egypt in the 1984 Summer Olympics, He also played for Zamalek. He represented Egypt in the 1980 African Cup of Nations and 1984 Summer Olympics.

References

External links
 
 
 11v11 Profile

1955 births
Living people
Egyptian footballers
Egypt international footballers
1980 African Cup of Nations players
Footballers at the 1984 Summer Olympics
Olympic footballers of Egypt
Competitors at the 1983 Mediterranean Games
Mediterranean Games bronze medalists for Egypt
Association football goalkeepers
Zamalek SC players
Egyptian Premier League players
Mediterranean Games medalists in football